The Copa Presidente de la República was played during the 1970 FIFA World Cup. The 16 clubs were divided into 4 groups and the top two teams advanced to the quarterfinals. The champions were Universitario.

Teams

Group stage

Group A

Group B

Group C

Group D

Quarterfinals

Semifinals

Final

References

External links
Peruvian Football Federation 
RSSSF

Peru
Tor
Peruvian Primera División